George Young (born 10 October 2001) is a Welsh rugby union player for Dragons in the United Rugby Championship. Young's primary position is flanker.

Rugby Union career

Professional career

Young was named in the Dragons academy squad for the 2021–22 season. He made his debut for the Dragons in Round 12 of the 2021–22 United Rugby Championship against .

References

2001 births
Living people
Dragons RFC players
Rugby union flankers
Welsh rugby union players